Dabra Airport is an airport in Dabra, Indonesia.

References

 World Airport Codes

Airports in Papua (province)